Dominggus Fakdawer (born 31 December 1990) is an Indonesian professional footballer who plays as a defender for Liga 1 club Persita Tangerang.

Club career
He has played for Persiram Raja Ampat and Persita Tangerang before moving to Persipura Jayapura in 2014.

On October 23, 2014, he was given a two-match ban after being involved in a fight involving players and team officials in a match against Arema.

Honours

Club
Persipura Jayapura
 Indonesia Soccer Championship A: 2016

References

External links
 

1989 births
Living people
People from Sorong
Indonesian footballers
Liga 1 (Indonesia) players
Liga 2 (Indonesia) players
Papuan people
Persipura Jayapura players
Persita Tangerang players
Persiram Raja Ampat players
Sriwijaya F.C. players
Perseru Serui players
Persiba Balikpapan players
Association football defenders
Sportspeople from Papua